The Surguja Express is a daily express train of North Central Railway, in India, running between Gwalior City in Madhya Pradesh and Ambikapur town in Chhattisgarh.

Number and nomenclature
The number provided for the train is 1129 from Gwalior and 1130 from Ambikapur. The name Surguja signifies the former name of Ambikapur District when it was a part and district of Madhya Pradesh.

Route and halts
The train runs daily via Guna–Bina–Katni–Anuppur route. The intermediate stoppage of the train are:
 Gwalior Junction 11:05 
 Mohana 12:15-12:16
 Shivpuri 12:50-12:55
 Kolaras 13:25-13:26
 Badarwas 14:00-14:01
 Guna Junction 16:00-16:15
 Ashoknagar 17:05-17:08
 Mungaoli 18:00-18:02
 Bina Jn. 19:00-19:20
 Khurai 19:45-19:47
 Saugor 20:40-20:45
 Patharia 21:30-21:31
 Damoh 22:00-22:05
 Bandakpur 22:30-22:31
 Katni Murwara 00:30-00:45
 Chandia Road 02:15-02:16
 Umaria 02:40-02:42
 Birsinghpur 03:20-03:22
 Shahdol 03:40-03:45
 Amlai 04:15-04:17
 Anuppur Junction 04:40-04:50
 Kotma 05:30-05:33
 Bijuri 06:00-06:05
 Boridand Junction 06:15-06:17
 Nagpur Road 06:40-06:41
 Darritola Junction 06:46-06:48
 Nagar 06:58-07:00
 Baikunthpur Road 07:10-07:12
 Katora 07:25-07:27
 Sheoprasadnagar 07:40:07:42
 Surajpur Road 07:50-07:52
 Karonji 08:00-08:02
 Bishrampur 08:20-08:25
 Kamalpurgram 08:45-08:46
 Ambikapur Terminal 09:30

Arrival and departure
The 1129 Ambikapur Surguja Express departs from Gwalior at 10:00 daily and reaches Ambikapur at 4:00 am the next day.
The 1130 Gwalior Sarguja Express departs from Ambikapur at 7:00 am and reaches Gwalior at 1:00 am the next day.

Coach info
The train consists of 24 coaches as follows:
 1 AC-1st cum 2nd
 1  AC-2 Tier coach
 3  AC-3 Tier coach
 10 Sleeper coach
 7  general coach
 2  SLR
The train does not contain any pantry car (Rasoi Yaan), so passengers are advised to bring their own food while travelling.

Average speed
The train runs with an average speed of 67 km/h.

Important junctions
The train crosses over Guna–Bina–Katni–Anuppur major junctions.

See also
 Bhopal Express
 Bhopal Shatabdi
 Malwa Express
 Avantika Express

Transport in Gwalior
Named passenger trains of India
Rail transport in Madhya Pradesh
Rail transport in Chhattisgarh
Express trains in India